Mike Tyson vs. Buster Douglas, billed as Tyson is Back!, was a professional boxing match that occurred at the Tokyo Dome on February 11, 1990. The then-undefeated, undisputed heavyweight champion Tyson lost by knockout to the 42:1 underdog Douglas. The fight is widely regarded as the biggest upset in boxing history.

Background
Going into the fight, Mike Tyson was the undefeated and undisputed heavyweight champion of the world and was very popular at the time. He held the WBC, WBA, and IBF titles. Despite the several controversies that marred Tyson's profile at the time, such as his allegedly abusive relationship with Robin Givens, the contractual battles between longtime manager Bill Cayton and promoter Don King, and Tyson's departure from longtime trainer Kevin Rooney, Tyson was still dominant in the ring, scoring a 93-second knockout against Carl "The Truth" Williams in his previous fight. Most considered this fight to be a warm-up bout for Tyson before meeting up with then-undefeated number 1 heavyweight contender Evander Holyfield (who was ringside for the fight).  Tyson was viewed as such a dominant heavyweight that he was not only viewed as the world's top heavyweight, but often as the number one fighter in the world pound-for-pound (including by Ring Magazine), a rarity for heavyweights.

Buster Douglas was ranked as the No. 7 heavyweight by Ring Magazine, and had met with mixed success in his professional boxing career up to that point. His previous title fight was against Tony Tucker in 1987, in which he was TKO'd in the 10th round. However, a string of six consecutive wins gave him the opportunity to fight Tyson. In the time leading up to the fight, Douglas faced a number of personal setbacks, including the death of his mother, Lula Pearl, 23 days before the fight. Additionally, the mother of his son had a severe kidney ailment, and he had contracted the flu on the day before the fight.

HBO boxing analysts Larry Merchant and Jim Lampley expected to see "another 90-second annihilation." (When asked by a Japanese customs official how long he expected to be working in Japan, Ed Schuyler of the Associated Press replied, "Oh, about ninety seconds.") Instead of discussing Douglas's chances against Tyson, Merchant and Lampley compared their pets: Tyson had a white pitbull named "Duran" (after his idol Roberto Durán) while Douglas had a beagle named "Shakespeare." Merchant, after saying that "this fight is over before it begins or soon thereafter" and describing Douglas as "just another frozen tuna" from the Tokyo fish market, opined that "any prizefighter with a dog named Shakespeare can't be all-bad." In an interview given to HBO prior to the fight, Douglas told reporters that his favorite Shakespeare play was the romantic tragedy Romeo and Juliet. Lampley suggested that if Tyson were asked the same question (assuming he had read Shakespeare), he would choose something more bloody and violent, such as Henry the Fifth or Macbeth.

Singer Bobby Brown wrote in his autobiography that he met with Tyson in Tokyo and the two partied extensively the night before the fight. Brown claims Tyson refused to go to sleep early for the fight, deeming Douglas "an amateur" he could beat "if I didn't sleep for five weeks".

Fight

From the beginning of the fight, it was apparent that Douglas was not afraid. As an initial surprise, Douglas displayed a lot of spring in his body movement and was not cautious in letting his punches fly whenever he saw the opportunity to attack Tyson. He used his quick and accurate jab to prevent Tyson from getting inside, where Tyson was most dangerous.  When Tyson tried to get inside, Douglas tied him up, moved away, or would immediately hit Tyson with multiple punches as Tyson came within Douglas' range. Early on, Douglas was more agile than Tyson and outlanded Tyson in exchanges. Douglas finished the second round with a snappy uppercut to Tyson's chin.

Seeming to regain his form, Tyson landed a punishing left to the body that had Douglas look at his corner. After an ineffectual and lackluster third round, Tyson cornerman Jay Bright screamed at his fighter "Don't just stand there and look at him, you've gotta work!" Boxer "Sugar" Ray Leonard, at ringside doing commentary for HBO, noted Douglas' dominance with the jab and right hand and said Tyson was having one of those occasional days in the ring where "you just don't have it...things just don't click in".

Douglas would still dominate the middle rounds, although Tyson managed to land a few of his signature uppercuts. Tyson was wobbled by a chopping right during the fifth round. Soon, Tyson's left eye began to swell from Douglas' right jabs, preventing him from seeing his opponent's punches well. Tyson's cornermen were caught unprepared; they had not brought an endswell or ice packs, usually standard equipment for a fight, as they were so confident that Tyson would easily beat Douglas. Instead, they filled a rubber glove with ice water and held it on Tyson's eye between rounds. At one point, Aaron Snowell, Tyson's primary cornerman caught the chain from the identification badge hanging from his neck between the iced glove and Tyson's eye.  As Snowell moved, Tyson winced in pain as the chain dragged from one side of his injured eye to the other.  Confusion and panic grew in his corner as the fight went on.  Despite Tyson's inability to execute an effective fight plan, his corner continued to give him the same advice between rounds to move his head, jab his way inside and deliver a right hand. In the eighth round, a round Douglas dominated until the last few seconds, HBO's Larry Merchant noted "Douglas is asking of Tyson, some questions he hasn't been asked before...in the last few rounds of a fight you have to come back and win it."

Within the last 10 seconds of the 8th round, Tyson, who had been backed onto the ropes, landed a big right uppercut that sent Douglas to the canvas. Although the knockdown timekeeper began when Douglas's backside touched the ring's surface, the referee was said to have started his own count behind by two beats. Douglas rose as the referee signaled nine, but the bell ended the round. In obvious annoyance at his own lapse, Douglas pounded his left fist on the mat. Tyson promoter Don King would later argue the validity of the referee count in vain.

In the 9th round, Tyson came out aggressively to try to end the fight and save his title, hoping that Douglas was still hurt from the 8th-round knockdown. Douglas was able to fight off Tyson's attack and was able to close Tyson's eye completely. Both men traded punches before Douglas connected on a four-punch combination that staggered Tyson back to the ropes. With Tyson hurt along the ropes, Douglas closed in and unleashed a four-punch attack to try to knock Tyson out. Tyson withstood the punishment and barely survived the ninth round.

In the tenth round, Tyson pushed forward, but he was still seriously hurting from the accumulation of punishment he had absorbed throughout the match. As Tyson advanced, Douglas measured him with a few jabs before landing an uppercut that snapped Tyson's head upward, stopping Tyson in his tracks. As Tyson reeled back, Douglas immediately followed with four punches to the head, knocking Tyson down for the first time in his career.  In a famous scene, Tyson fumbled for his mouthpiece on the canvas before sticking one end in his mouth with the other end hanging out. The champion attempted to make it back to his feet, but referee Octavio Meyran counted him out. Buster Douglas thus became the new undisputed heavyweight champion, engineering one of the biggest upsets in boxing history. The official scorecards through nine rounds were 87–86 for Tyson, 86–86, and 88–83 for Douglas.

During the post fight interview, Douglas broke down in tears when asked why he was able to win this fight when no one thought he could. "Because of my mother...God bless her heart," said the emotional new champion.

Merchant concluded that it was the expulsion of Kevin Rooney, who still rooted for Tyson every time he watched him fight (despite their split), which led to the stunning knockout loss. Merchant said that Tyson needed Rooney much the same way Muhammad Ali needed Angelo Dundee. Merchant speculated that with Rooney in his corner, Tyson would have managed to end the fight on his feet, and to change the tide of the fight, exactly as in the Tucker fight, after he was rocked in the first round but with Rooney's help he weathered the storm and came back determined to win, outboxing his opponent. Butch Lewis shared the same opinion, believing that after he finally got rid of Rooney, Tyson found himself in a situation where there was no one to enforce compliance with the training regimen and a normal daily routine, and tell him "Back on track, Mike!" when needed. So did Jerry Izenberg, who commented: "They assemble a corner for that fight which looks like it was picked up out of the semi-finals of the Intercity Golden Gloves."

Aftermath
As a 42-1 underdog, Douglas earned $1.3 million from the fight while Tyson got $6 million.

Tyson's camp, led by Don King, immediately protested the result, claiming that Douglas had been given a long count by referee Octavio Meyran. The WBA and WBC initially agreed and suspended recognition of Douglas as champion, although the IBF immediately accepted that the result was valid. After a public outcry and demands from boxing commissions around the world that they acknowledge Douglas as the champion, the protest was withdrawn and Douglas' win was recognised four days after the fight. In spite of Douglas' inspired and dominant performance, a sizable number of boxing fans viewed the fight outcome as an aberration, leading to interest in a rematch.

In an HBO studio interview with Merchant the following week, Douglas stated the protest and post-fight confusion ruined what should have been the best time of his life.

At the time of the fight, Don King was said to have been negotiating for Tyson's next fight to be in the fall in Berlin against former champion Greg Page, who had decked Tyson while sparring with him three weeks before the Douglas fight. A future Mike Tyson versus George Foreman fight to be promoted by the Sultan of Brunei was also shelved.

Plans for a rematch fell through, so Douglas' first title defence was against No. 1 contender Evander Holyfield. An overweight Douglas, weighing  more than in the Tyson fight, was knocked out by Holyfield in the third round. Douglas retired after the fight. Six years later, he launched a comeback after almost dying in a diabetic coma and won a few fights against journeyman opposition. He fought for the last time in 1999. Despite rumours of a rematch with Tyson throughout the 1990s, they never faced each other again.

Tyson would fight four more times after the Douglas fight before being convicted of raping beauty pageant contestant Desiree Washington in 1991. Following his release from the Indiana Youth Center in 1995 he quickly regained the WBA and WBC world titles, before losing them to Holyfield and was never again a world champion. He fought on sporadically for another decade and lost in another title challenge against Lennox Lewis in 2002. He retired from boxing in 2005 after consecutive losses to journeymen.

Buster Douglas went down in sports lore as a prize fighter who defied the odds to pull off one of the biggest upsets in sports history. Among the honors was a cover photo on an issue of Sports Illustrated with the title "Rocky Lives!," after the popular film series about a similarly underestimated boxing hero. For Tyson, though he retained a menacing aura for years afterwards, "the mystique of the untouchable, invincible 'Baddest Man on the Planet' had been shattered." The fight is often ranked among the biggest upsets in sports history.

The fight appeared in the Mike Tyson Mysteries episode "Help a Brother Out."

In popular culture

Douglas's upset against Tyson is the inspiration for The Killers' song "Tyson vs Douglas" from their Wonderful Wonderful album. Singer songwriter Brandon Flowers used the childhood memory of watching the seemingly invincible Tyson lose as the motivation for a song that's about "me and my family, and the way I’m perceived by my kids. I don’t want them to see me go down like Tyson." The song also features audio of the commentators for the fight.

Broadcasting

References

This was in 1992, as no award in 1991.

1990 in boxing
Boxing in Japan
Boxing on HBO
Sports competitions in Tokyo
1990 in Japanese sport
Douglas
World Boxing Association heavyweight championship matches
World Boxing Council heavyweight championship matches
International Boxing Federation heavyweight championship matches
February 1990 sports events in the United States